The Austin Daily Herald  is an American, English language newspaper published Tuesday-Saturday mornings in Austin, Minnesota.  Distribution is 5,280, mostly within Austin, Minnesota.  It also publishes the Shopping News which is distributed to 16,000 households on Sundays free of charge.

It was founded in 1891 as a six-day-a-week daily by A.B. Hunkins, inventor of the automatic addressing press.

The Austin Daily Herald is currently owned by Boone Newspapers, Inc.

References

Mower County, Minnesota
Newspapers published in Minnesota
Austin, Minnesota